Donald "Don" Strachey is a fictional character who appears in novels by mystery writer Richard Stevenson.

Strachey, a gay man, lives in Albany, New York, with his partner Timothy Callahan. Don's clients often feel that his sexual orientation gives him an edge when called upon to investigate cases that involve Albany's gay community.

Shavick Entertainment has adapted four of the Donald Strachey books into films for the LGBT television network Here!. The films have starred openly gay actor Chad Allen as Strachey.

Supporting characters

Timothy Callahan 
Timothy "Tim" Callahan is a legislative aide to a New York state senator, and Strachey's life partner.  He is the only character besides Strachey to have appeared in all the novels and the films, in the latter of which he is portrayed by actor Sebastian Spence.  In Ice Blues, Tim recalls how his sister Kelly was forced out of their home because of an estrangement between her and their parents.  Tim and Kelly hadn't talked for years because of this, but at the end of the film, Donald manages to use his P.I. abilities to locate her, reuniting them.

Detective Sean 'Bub' Bailey
Detective Bailey meets Strachey in Third Man Out, wherein he tries to convince Strachey to persuade gay rights activist John Rutka to leave Albany. In Ice Blues, Bub is revealed to have had an affair with Joan Lenigan after she killed her husband.  He is portrayed in the films by Daryl Shuttleworth.  The character in the novels most analogous to him is Detective Sergeant Ned Bowman, but it is arguable whether they can be considered "the same" due to the substantial differences between the two characters.

Kenny Kwon
An original character developed for the films, Kenny Kwon is played by Nelson Wong.  Strachey first meets him at the Parmalee Plaza Hotel, and trashes Kwon's boss's office while working on a case to find out who might have killed Rutka.  In Shock to the System, Kwon tracks down Strachey and reveals that he was fired shortly after that incident, and lays the blame at Strachey's feet.  Donald agrees to give him a job as Strachey Investigations' receptionist.  In On the Other Hand, Death, Kenny reveals that he is taking class to get a P.I. license of his own, and Strachey sends him out to tail a corrupt cop so he can fulfill the field experience requirements to obtain it.

Donald Strachey mysteries

Films
 Third Man Out (2005)
 Shock to the System (2006)
 On the Other Hand, Death (2008)
 Ice Blues (2008)

External links
The Donald Strachey Series

References

Fictional private investigators
Fictional gay males
Fictional characters from New York (state)
Fictional LGBT characters
Fictional LGBT characters in literature
Fictional LGBT characters in television
Fictional LGBT characters in film